The 1990–91 NBA season was the Mavericks' 11th season in the National Basketball Association. During the off-season, the Mavericks signed free agent All-Star forward Alex English, while acquiring his teammate All-Star guard Fat Lever from the Denver Nuggets, and Rodney McCray from the Sacramento Kings. However, the Mavericks troubles would start early as Lever, and Roy Tarpley were both lost early in the season with season ending knee injuries. While on the injured list, Tarpley would again be suspended for substance abuse by the NBA. Despite winning four of their first five games, the Mavericks struggled and lost 10 of their next 13 games. Their struggles continued as they lost eight consecutive games near the end of the season, finishing sixth in the Midwest Division with a 28–54 record.

Rolando Blackman led the team in scoring with 19.9 points per game, while Derek Harper averaged 19.7 points, 7.1 assists and 1.9 steals per game, and Herb Williams provided the team with 12.5 points, 6.0 rebounds and 1.5 blocks per game. In addition, McCray averaged 11.4 points and 7.6 rebounds per game, while James Donaldson provided with 10.0 points and 8.9 rebounds per game, English contributed 9.7 points per game, and second-year forward Randy White averaged 8.8 points and 6.4 rebounds per game. Following the season, English retired.

Draft picks

Roster

Regular season

Season standings

y - clinched division title
x - clinched playoff spot

z - clinched division title
y - clinched division title
x - clinched playoff spot

Record vs. opponents

Game log

Player statistics

Awards and records

Transactions

References

See also
 1990-91 NBA season

Dallas Mavericks seasons
Dallas
Dallas
Dallas